The 2006–07 Creighton Bluejays men's basketball team represented Creighton University in the 2006–07 NCAA Division I men's basketball season. Led by head coach Dana Altman in his 13th season, the Bluejays would end the season with a record of 22–11 (13-5 MVC). They won the 2007 MVC Tournament to receive an automatic bid to the NCAA Tournament. Playing as the No. 10 seed in the South region, Creighton was beaten by No. 7 seed Nevada in the opening round. This was Coach Altman’s 7th and final NCAA Tournament team as head coach of the Jays.

Roster

Schedule and results

|-
!colspan=9 style=| Regular Season

|-
!colspan=9 style=| MVC Tournament

|-
!colspan=9 style=| NCAA Tournament

References

Creighton Bluejays men's basketball seasons
Creighton
Creighton
Creighton Bluejays Men's Basketball
Creighton Bluejays Men's Basketball